Maa Baap is a Bollywood film. It was released in 1944. The film was directed by V. M. Vyas. It was produced under the Sunrise Pictures banner. The film starred Veena, Nazir, Yakub, Majeed, Amirbai Karnataki, Dixit, Jagdish, Rajkumari Shukal. The music was composed by Alla Rakha and the lyrics were by Roopbani.

References

External links
 

1944 films
1940s Hindi-language films
Indian drama films
Indian black-and-white films
1944 drama films
Hindi-language drama films